CFCW-FM (98.1 MHz, New Country 98.1) is a radio station licensed to Camrose, Alberta. Owned by Stingray Radio, it broadcasts a country format.

The station began broadcasting in 2003 with a country format that had moved over to CKRA-FM in Edmonton in 2005 to make room for the adult hits format on 98.1 FM, known at the time as 98.1 CAM-FM. As of November 30, 2017, the country format returned to the station now rebranded as New Country 98.1.

References

External links
New Country 98.1
 

Fcw
FCW
Fcw
Camrose, Alberta
Radio stations established in 2005
2005 establishments in Alberta